Pointe au Baril is a community in the Canadian province of Ontario, located on the east coast of Georgian Bay.

The community is located in the township of The Archipelago in the Parry Sound District.

Pointe au Baril is a popular destination in all four seasons for boating, camping, sport-fishing, snowmobiling, and more. It is made up of a collection of islands, with access to the main land on the eastern shore of Georgian Bay. Pointe au Baril has a permanent population of 200-250 people, but increases to about 8,000 over the summer.

Community name
Pointe au Baril was named after the barrel on the point that originally (1870s) marked the treacherous entry to the main channel from the open water of Georgian Bay. Early fur traders from Penetanguishene apparently lost a canoe near the point. Their canoe included a barrel of whiskey that was found by stranded traders the next spring.  After a drinking spree the barrel was left on the point as a beacon.  French mariners were soon calling it Pointe-au-Baril.  Later this marker was improved to include a lantern in the barrel that would be lit by the first fisherman returning inland to light the way for the rest of the boats.

Pointe au Baril Station
Pointe au Baril may refer to the original Barrel on the Point reference or the actual village, built around a train station, about six nautical miles (11 km, 7 miles) away.  Highway 69 follows the same path as the railway and they both run past the east tip of what is known as the Main Channel. This channel is a well marked route from the village to the lighthouse.

The village has a North Shore and a South Shore road but islander travel is by boat.  The village is referred to as The Station by most residents.  Pointe au Baril Station is well suited for launching water craft and is supported by many marinas and a substantial public dock.

Historic landmarks

Lighthouse
The point is lit by the recently automated lighthouse. This historic lighthouse opens its doors for tours in the summer months. The lighthouse is a part of a light system which includes a range tower (about one half nautical mile behind the lighthouse) and a turn buoy (nearly three nautical miles offshore from the lighthouse) which work together to allow safe passage through the many shoals that cover the eastern coast of Georgian Bay. The first Lighthouse keeper was Samuel Edward Oldfield (1843-1917) who was appointed in 1889.

Firetower
The Pointe au Baril firetower lookout was erected in the 1920s to detect forest fires. This 80 foot light-steel tower was part of the Parry Sound Fire District tower system. It stood near the centre of the village, just west of the railway tracks and near the bay on a small hill. When aerial fire fighting techniques were employed by the province many of the towers like this one were disassembled in the early 1970s. The footings, however, are still there to this day.

Fishing and logging
Pointe au Baril became a community to support commercial fishing in the 1870s.  The last fishing operation based in Pointe au Baril was shut down in the 1980s.

A lumber industry existed in the area during these same years.  The pine, hemlock and yellow birch forestry ended in the 1940s, shortly after the end of World War II.

Today

The area is now primarily a cottage community on Highway 69. The channels and islands of the region make it a boating, fishing and islander paradise.  It has also become a destination for snowmobiling in the winter months.

Among the many islands there is the historic Ojibway Club founded by Hamilton Davis in 1906 as a hotel. Many of Davis's descendents still summer in Pointe au Baril to this day.

The population grows from a winter low of about 250 to 300 to a summer high of 8000 or more. Additional growth is expected in the future as Highway 400 is extended past the community.

With the demolition of Larry's Tavern for the expansion of the highway, there remains one restaurant, The Haven, which is open all year, The Harbour View, which is only open during the summer months and the Shell Station Deli. There are also two chip wagons located in Pointe au Baril, one open only during the summer, while the other remains open all year.

Community events in Pointe au Baril include the Winter Whirl carnival, held the first weekend in February, Canada Day festivities, and the Pickerel Dinner and Annual Lobster Fest held the third weekend in July. The ducky race is another local festival held in Pointe au Baril organized by the North Eastern Georgian Bay Snowmobile Club right in downtown Pointe au Baril.  Summertime events also include Arts on the Bay Dinner theatre in the Pointe au Baril Community Centre.

Pointe au Baril has a community centre with a library in it. The town also offers an ice rink and playground. Pointe au Baril also has a Nursing Station and an Emergency response team.

Pointe au Baril's cottage community is largely water access and is home to many marinas.

Early exploration
The area was explored by Samuel de Champlain in 1615.  A monument was erected in the 1940s to commemorate his travels through the area.  It can be found near the newly renovated Ojibway Club, a favoured gathering place for many of the islanders.

Transportation
Intercity motor coach service to the community is provided by Ontario Northland along its Toronto–Barrie–Parry Sound–Sudbury route local schedule; it is bypassed by express schedules, but still receives daily service northbound and southbound.

Literature
Pointe au Baril is also a setting of John Irving's novel Last Night in Twisted River, where many of the places are described in the winter setting, including nearby islands.

Pointe au Baril is also in a nouvel in the book of Alicia Munroe du Cote de Castle Rock.

References

External links

Pointe au Baril Chamber of Commerce
Pointe au Baril Islanders' Association

Communities in Parry Sound District